"Secret Empire" is a 2017 Marvel Comics crossover storyline published by Marvel Comics, consisting of a 10-issue, eponymous miniseries written by Nick Spencer and illustrated by Rod Reis, Daniel Acuña, Steve McNiven, and Andrea Sorrentino, and numerous tie-in books. The storyline addresses the aftermath of the storyline "Avengers: Standoff!" and the ongoing series Captain America: Steve Rogers, in which Captain America has been revealed to be acting as a sleeper agent and covertly setting the stage to establish the terrorist organization Hydra as the main world power. The entire crossover received mixed reviews.

Publication history
The initial groundwork for "Secret Empire" was laid in the 2016 miniseries Avengers: Standoff!, which had also been written by Nick Spencer. In that story, the being known as Kobik transformed the elderly, 90-year-old Steve Rogers back into the youthful and physically formidable superhuman he had previously been thanks to his receiving the Super Soldier Serum in World War II. These events were explored further in the ensuing ongoing series Captain America: Steve Rogers, in which the transformation is revealed to have been masterminded by Rogers' archenemy, the Red Skull, who altered Captain America's memories, making him an agent of the terrorist organization Hydra. This was part of the Red Skull's plan to bring  the American government to its knees and enable Hydra to become a world-power. Throughout the rest of 2016 and the first half of 2017, subsequent issues of Captain America: Sam Wilson, Thunderbolts and Captain America: Steve Rogers, along with tie-in issues of Uncanny Avengers and U.S.Avengers and the storyline "Civil War II" unveiled how Captain America planned to alter the playing field covertly without the knowledge of the his fellow superheroes.

In early 2017 Marvel began to release teaser posters in anticipation for the "Secret Empire"storyline. One month after the posters were released it was announced that the limited series would be sold twice monthly and would be a total of nine issues, including a prelude issue serving as #0, with issue #1 set to be released in May 2017 and issue #8 would end the limited series in August that same year. Editor-in-chief Axel Alonso went on to mention that one of the main purposes for the storyline was to unify the Marvel superheroes following the divisive events of the "Civil War II" and the "Inhumans vs X-Men" storylines, so that they could face a common foe. In March it was revealed that some of the members of the creative team included Steve McNiven (Monsters Unleashed), Nick Spencer (Captain America: Steve Rogers), Andrea Sorrentino (Old Man Logan), and Leinil Yu (Star Wars). In April it was announced that the conclusion of "Secret Empire" would be followed by an 18-month hiatus for Marvel from large crossover events, the company's longest consecutive gap without any such event in twelve years. Issue #0 was released on April 19, 2017 and the first issue was released on May 3.

Premise
The storyline deals with Hydra's takeover of the United States after Captain America is revealed to be one of their agents ever since the sentient Cosmic Cube Kobik affected his memories upon Red Skull's clone using her powers on him. This causes the rest of the superheroes to join forces and rebel against their former leader and friend to prevent the United States from falling under Hydra's control.

Plot

Issue 0
Since the incident at Pleasant Hill, Captain America's memories were rewritten by the sentient Cosmic Cube Kobik, who was manipulated by the Red Skull's clone into making Steve think he had been a Hydra sleeper agent since World War II. As Chitauri forces launch a massive attack on Earth, Rogers is now head of S.H.I.E.L.D. where he is appointed head of Earth's defense forces during the assault. He dispatches Captain Marvel, the Ultimates (Blue Marvel, America Chavez, Spectrum), the Alpha Flight Space Program, the Guardians of the Galaxy (Star-Lord, Gamora, Rocket Raccoon, Groot), Hyperion, and Quasar to intercept the Chitauri outside Earth's atmosphere as Ironheart and her Tony Stark A.I. as Iron Man prepare an attempt to establish an indestructible forcefield around the planet. At the same time, the Defenders (Daredevil, Iron Fist, Jessica Jones, Luke Cage), Doctor Strange, Spider-Woman, and Cloak and Dagger oppose an assault by various members of Baron Zemo's Army of Evil. While Hyperion and Quasar are taken out of the battle by the Chitauri, Nitro explodes defeating the Defenders. The villains disappear upon the Avenger Unity Division's arrival. Just as the Planetary Defense Shield around the Earth is brought online, Rogers reveals his allegiance to Hydra as the Hydra Supreme by trapping Captain Marvel's forces outside of Earth's atmosphere. Meanwhile, all of Manhattan is imprisoned within the Darkforce Dimension after Baron Helmut Zemo uses the Darkhold to enhance Blackout's abilities. Iron Man sends a signal out to the other heroes to meet in Washington, D.C. as fast as they can.

Issue 1
Hydra's influence has spread to various facets of American society. Inhumans now must submit to registration as soon as their powers manifest or face arrest as seen when Hydra picks up a young man named Brian McAllister upon being outed by a kid who bullies his younger brother. A section of western California is rechristened "New Tian" for all mutants to reside. A hacker named Rayshaun Lucas is entrusted with key data by Rick Jones that Rick says will prove the truth about Captain America. Shaun successfully makes contact with the Champions (Ms. Marvel, Spider-Man, Viv Vision, and Hulk) accompanied by Ironheart and Falcon. The Champions lead him to a base in Las Vegas housing various heroes who make up an underground resistance to the HYDRA regime with the Resistance consisting of Hawkeye, Ant-Man, Black Widow, Giant-Man, Hercules, Quicksilver, Rescue, Stingray, Thing, Tigra, Wonder Man, and others. Manhattan remains trapped in the Darkforce Dimension and Carol's team remain trapped in space as she sends out a distress call, asking for the help of any alien races. Hydra Supreme leads Hydra's version of the Avengers consisting of Black Ant, Deadpool, Odinson, Superior Octopus, Scarlet Witch, Taskmaster, and Vision who ruthlessly deal with the monster Krigorrath. At a meeting with the Hydra Council, Hydra Supreme rejects the option to reaffirm control of the populace through mind control. Rick and Sharon Carter, who have both been captured, refuse to swear loyalty to Hydra. To make a statement, Hydra Supreme has Rick sentenced to death by firing squad and dispatches Hydra Helicarriers to raze the city of Las Vegas. Meanwhile, Hydra Supreme and Madame Hydra resume their search for the Cosmic Cube in order to undo the Allies' victory in World War II.

Issue 2
Having received and analyzed Rick's data, Tony determines that the Cosmic Cube used to alter Steve has been scattered around the world as shards, speculating that they can restore Rogers to himself if they can bring the fragments together. While Hawkeye agrees with this theory, assembling a strike force of Mockingbird, Ant-Man, Hercules, and Quicksilver to find the Cosmic Cube fragments, Black Widow sets off to kill Rogers herself reasoning that even if Rick's theory is true, the man Steve was would prefer to die than be used in this manner. She finds herself followed by the Champions as she establishes her version of the Red Room. In New York, Dagger fights to maintain light in the city, demons are running free, Claire Temple tends to the ill civilians, and the Kingpin uses his political clout to provide supplies to the locals after saving those in the church from the armed robbers that he killed trying to raid the church for medical supplies. Hydra Supreme grimly reflects on his recent actions where he revealed that he actually turned the final decision for Rick's execution and the assault on Vegas over to Madame Hydra. Zemo assures him of his value as a symbol. An unidentified woman is being pursued through an unknown forest by the Serpent Society members Bushmaster, Puff Adder, and Viper in the wilderness. They assault her until she is rescued by a haggard, bearded man in a torn World War II-era army uniform who introduces himself as Steve Rogers and states that he is trying to get home.

Issue 3
As this "new" Steve Rogers escorts the woman he rescued through the forest, she reveals she's been poisoned during the resulting battle and is dying. Steve reveals that his only memories are of what is implied to be his basic training days. Meanwhile, outside the safety of Earth's force field, Star-Lord, Rocket Raccoon, and Groot try to enlist representatives of the Skrulls, Kree, Brood, Shi'ar and Spartax empires that are on the Galactic Council in helping against the Chitauri hordes and to break down the Planetary Defense Shield and get rid of Hydra. Realizing they are now facing a galaxy without human interference, the Galactic Council refuses aid and attempt to kill the three Guardians as they flee. As Star-Lord tells Captain Marvel what happened amongst the Chitauri attacks, Quasar is still comatose. Back on Earth, Black Widow makes her way to a safehouse owned by Boomerang who is now a crime boss in Newark, New Jersey. Boomerang is hiding Maria Hill who is working with the criminal underworld to hide from the regime. Hill and Widow begin training the Champions, pushing them to learn how to kill. While the resistance seeks a Cosmic Cube shard, Hydra Supreme is called away from attending a Hydra science fair alongside a reluctant Sharon Carter by news from Kraken that another shard has been located in Atlantis. As Hydra's Avengers invade and destroy the Atlantean temple, they discover that the shard they've tracked down is a fake planted by Namor to keep them from discovering the real one. This is the second failed attempt to recover a shard after an ill-fated mission into Wakanda to retrieve another. Before Steve can take the failure out on Hydra's Avengers, he receives word that another shard has been located. Mockingbird leads the task force to find Sam Wilson. They come across the base of the Ultron/Hank Pym hybrid who decides to give his "family" a warm welcome. As the new Steve Rogers and the woman travel through the forest, the woman succumbs to her injuries and dies. But before she passes, she promises Steve he'll find his way home if he "stays true to himself." With a quick jump back to Newark, Boomerang awakens to discover a bomb in his safehouse. Though he survives the blast, a mysterious figure puts a gun in his face demanding knowledge of his criminal enterprises and of the resistance. Boomerang protests as it's revealed that the figure is the Punisher who is now apparently in the employ of Hydra.

Issue 4
Confronted by Batroc the Leaper, Living Laser, and Whirlwind, the tattered Steve is assisted by figures who appear to be Sam Wilson and Bucky Barnes, who suggest that they stick together. It has also been suggested the two characters coming to Steve's aid are the both recently deceased James Rhodes and Rick Jones. Meanwhile, Black Widow is training the young heroes in interrogation techniques. Even though the others argue that the victim is too low-level to know anything, Widow kills the Hydra Agent when he attempts to escape. Having tracked the next fragment of the Cosmic Cube, the Underground and Hydra Supreme alongside the Hydra Avengers confront each other, but are captured by the Ultron/Hank Pym hybrid, who forces both teams to sit at a dinner table. During "dinner," Ultron reveals information about the Hydra Avengers like Odinson working with Hydra to reclaim Mjolnir, Scarlet Witch being possessed by Chthon, and Vision being affected by an A.I. virus. Ultron argues that he is doing this because the Avengers have become less of a family over the years as so many of them jump to obey Captain America or Iron Man despite past experience confirming that this is not always a good idea, but Tony counters that the only reason the team failed as a family was because of Hank's abuse towards Wasp. Enraged, Ultron is about to kill everyone, but Ant-Man is able to calm him down by arguing that Hank remains his own inspiration. Ultron allows the Underground to leave with the fragment, arguing that neither side should have an advantage over the other. Back in America, Hydra Supreme has put Namor in a position where he will be forced to sign a peace treaty that gives Rogers access to the Cosmic Cube fragment in Atlantis, but Hydra Supreme muses that he is unconcerned about who will acquire the fragments as he has an inside man in the Underground.

Issue 5
While doing business with some men, Viper is told by a Hydra agent that they have apprehended Black Widow. This is part of a diversion so that the Champions can infiltrate a Hydra base. When Viper figures out that Widow is planning to kill Hydra Supreme, Viper tries to persuade Widow to join up with her enterprise. When the Champions find a comatose man much to their confusion, Widow assures them that he is the person they are looking for. Travelling together through the woods, "Bucky" and "Sam" are accompanying "Steve." While on the Underground's transport, Ant-Man sends Stinger the updates on the quests for the Cosmic Cube fragments. As Iron Man speaks with Black Panther, he tells Tony that he is remaining neutral as Stark states that Hydra will not rest until they have all the Cosmic Cube shards. When Black Panther states that he can have Tony give him the Cosmic Cube shards that he has, he declines and takes his leave. After recapping a fight with the High Evolutionary and breaking into vaults, Ant-Man arrives with the Underground in Madripoor where they are attacked by the Hand, who are working for Hive. As Iron Man defeats Hive, Gorgon is knocked down by Hercules who turns into stone afterwards due to Gorgon's stare. When Iron Man frees Hydra's prisoner Shang-Chi, he reveals to Tony that he doesn't have the Cosmic Cube fragment anymore. A flashback reveals that Emma Frost stole it from an unconscious Shang. Hydra Supreme meets with New Tian's ambassador Beast in the site where Mjolnir is. He demands that New Tian's leaders surrender the fragment to him. While on a helicopter, Madame Hydra tells Hydra Supreme that Chthon has become increasingly uncontrollable, the A.I. virus made by Arnim Zola is still keeping Vision under control, and Odinson is still praying to Odin about his troubles where it was mentioned that Jane Foster is trapped in an alternate dimension and that she and Doctor Faustus can't subvert him. Back at the Underground, Giant-Man, Shaun, and Tony reveal that they don't have a Cosmic Cube-tracking device. As Zola mentions that their attacks won't bring down their defenses, the former Captain America states that they will unleash their secret weapon. Back in the mysterious forest, "Steve," "Sam," and "Bucky" encounter the Red Skull who plans to take them "home." Back at the Hydra Helicarrier, Arnim Zola tells Hydra Supreme that their subject in the vault is awake but disoriented and that the procedure they did on him is temporary as his condition will degrade quickly. After brushing off Arnim Zola's concerns, Hydra Supreme Steve Rogers states that they need their subject for a short time to bring the Underground down. When the vault opens, it is revealed that the person that they are talking about is a temporarily-resurrected Bruce Banner.

Issue 6
As the other Steve Rogers is hanging from a rope tied to a tree, he finds himself next to a rambling man. As the Red Skull takes the stranger away, he tells Steve that his time will come soon. Back in a Darkforce-covered Manhattan, Claire Temple and Cloak are trying to get Dagger to light up. Doctor Strange arrives at a supernatural library in order to find a spell that would set the city free. When Daredevil attacks some men, Kingpin clears things up with him stating that the men were taking supplies to Mercy General Hospital. Back in the mysterious forest, Steve asks Skull where he is as Skull claims that they are in "Hell." He also states that they are nothing but ghosts that are fading remnants into death. The Red Skull then uses a barbed bat on Steve's chest stating that the only path to peace is death. At the Red Room's safehouse in Maryland, Nadia Pym, the new Wasp, is leaving upon expressing her indignation the Champions want to talk Black Widow out of killing Hydra Supreme. Miles Morales tells Widow to have hope. During the siege at the Mount, Hydra Supreme asks Bruce Banner for his help during the little time that he has left. Tony is sure that someone in the Underground has tipped off Hydra. Mockingbird claims that Quicksilver is working for Hydra in exchange for Scarlet Witch's return while Quicksilver claims that Mockingbird led them on a wild goose chase. Back on the Hydra Helicarrier, Banner rejects Hydra Supreme's offer only for Rogers to reveal that he was talking to Hulk. Ant-Man reveals that he is Hydra's mole and explains that Hydra is using his daughter as leverage just as Hulk penetrates the fortress. As Thing fights Hulk, Mockingbird snaps Hawkeye out of his guilt-induced daze in order for him to help evacuate the Mount. As Giant-Man unleashes a set of A.I.vengers to help in the fight, Hawkeye, Mockingbird, and the civilian members of the Resistance run into Odinson who allows them to board their jet. While Sam Wilson takes off, Mockingbird notices that Tony hasn't left the base. As Iron Man prepares to leave, he is caught by surprise by Hydra Supreme, who uses Ultron-derived technology on Tony's armor to keep him from transferring himself elsewhere. While Iron Man is stuck fighting Hydra Supreme, the A.I.vengers help in the fight against the Hulk. As the final effects resurrection process start to wear off, Hulk collapses the roof over the Iron Man and Hydra Supreme. As Iron Man activates the Mount's "Clean Slate Protocol," he persuades Hydra Supreme to remain behind so that he can apologize to him. Back on the Hydra Helicarrier, Madame Hydra detects an unusual amount of energy in the Mount and rushes in. As Tony expresses his grief and remorse over what happened to Captain America after the first superhero civil war, he states that he didn't want to fail at helping Captain America again. Madame Hydra arrives and teleports Hydra Supreme away at the last second as Iron Man explodes, destroying the base and killing Madame Hydra. Back in Maryland, Black Widow hears about what happened at the Mount. She informs the Champions about what happened and that they will kill Hydra Supreme tomorrow.

Issue 7
Opening at the Alpha Flight Space Station, Captain Marvel is receiving an overall negative status report from Spectrum. While they are able to make inter-dimensional supply runs and have found the location of the Chitauri Queen Eggs, the waves of Chitauri and their Leviathans are increasing in size and frequency leaving the technicians without enough time to fix the severe structural damage to the station. Monica suggests that America relocate the heroes and people trapped outside the Planetary Defense Shield to an alternate reality given the Intergalactic Council in their reality are unsympathetic to Earth's plight. Captain Marvel rejects this idea stating the heroes were charged with a mission to protect the Earth against the Chitauri invasion and they are the only thing standing in the way if the shield were to go down for some reason. Captain Marvel then turns her attention to a comatose Avril Kincaid who we find out did survive being swallowed by the Leviathan and was pulled out of the wreckage by Nova. Captain Marvel admits her fault in the situation and the raising of the Planetary Defense Shield and pleads for the new Quasar to wake up. Meanwhile, the Red Skull tortures "Steve Rogers," claiming he is granting Steve "peace." Spider-Man and Black Widow are about to proceed with their mission to assassinate Hydra Supreme. Aware of Miles' supposed destiny of killing Captain America, Widow locks the young Spider-Man in a Hulk-proof transport section of her van and sets off to kill Rogers, rather than allowing Miles to become a killer. Black Widow heads out to the rubble of the Capitol Building in Washington DC and orchestrates her team to create a diversion which will allow her time to assassinate the Supreme Leader. It is at this moment we learn that the old man the team had rescued earlier was actually the prison used to hold the Inhuman, Mosaic. Widow frees Mosaic from the dying old man and he goes on to possess the Hydra Guards long enough for Widow to aim for Hydra Supreme. Their diversion is successful, but the Punisher arrives right before Black Widow can take the shot and the two begin to fight. Spider-Man is still trapped inside the Hulk-proof van as he has the idea of starting a fire and hoping that one of the emergency evacuation mechanisms will be activated. Miles escapes from the burning van and is on his way to the Capitol. The Punisher and Black Widow continue to fight until Widow stabs the Punisher in the shins. The Punisher explains Hydra Supreme's overall plan to use the Cosmic Cube is to put everything back to the "way it was." Not just the Axis victory in World War II, but bringing back all of the dead as a result of Hydra like Rick Jones, Jack Flag, and Castle's family. Black Widow rejects this idea and sees Miles approaching Hydra Supreme, prompting Widow to rush towards them. She fights her way through several Hydra guards, but somehow gets between Hydra Supreme attempting to strike Miles with the pointed edge of his shield. Black Widow is stabbed in the neck, falls to the ground, and seemingly dies. Her death enrages Spider-Man who shatters Hydra Supreme's shield with one punch. Miles proceeds to pummel Hydra Supreme to a bloody pulp. Right before he moves to impale Rogers on some debris, Wasp intervenes and dissuades Spider-Man from killing Hydra Supreme by reminding him that he is not a killer and that Black Widow did not want him to become one. The Champions are subsequently arrested. Weak from the attack, Rogers asks to be taken to Sharon on board the Hydra Helicarrier. On board, Hydra Supreme reveals to Sharon his plan to set things right with the Cosmic Cube and asks for her support while he is struggling with Madame Hydra's death. Sharon replies by attempting to stab him in the throat with a homemade shiv. She manages to prick Hydra Supreme's neck, but is stopped by him before she can inflict any real damage. As the guards take Sharon away, Hydra Supreme asks them to alert the Hydra High Council that tomorrow they will declare war. Meanwhile, Red Skull is about to deliver the killing blow to the other Steve Rogers. Before he can strike, Steve sees the woman he tried to save. He realizes there is still hope and evades the Skull's attack. Steve then tackles the Red Skull and they both plummet off the cliff into the water below. Out in Arizona, Hawkeye, Tigra, Giant Man, Mockingbird, Wonder Man, Quicksilver, and those with them have survived Hydra's attack on the Mount. Still, the team seems defeated and are now despondent upon witnessing Black Widow's death. It is at this time that Sam Wilson takes up the Captain America shield and mantle again and inspires the heroes that they must go on for the war is not over yet.

Issue 8
While sinking to the bottom of the river, "Steve Rogers" gets a glimpse of light from the surface enough to break free from his ropes. In the middle of a desert somewhere in Nevada, Rayshaun Lucas and Giant-Man are burying the time capsule that the latter put together that has been scheduled to reach the Alpha Flight space station and Manhattan in the past. Once that's done, the message makes it to Manhattan and the space station in the present where they are informed of Hydra's rule over the United States while also informing them that most of the Cosmic Cube fragments are in Hydra's possession. As Sam takes off in order to get between the Earth and the dome, Iron Man and Hawkeye break into Crossbones and Sin's super-prison to free their captive friends. On the Alpha Flight space station, Captain Marvel is approached by Star-Lord and Rocket Raccoon where they have plans for a Nullifier Bomb where they would use the space station to detonate the charges. In the Darkforce Dimension, as the Defenders wonder how they can help, Doctor Strange states that he has obtained a spell which he learned in exchange for control over the Sanctum Sanctorum. Miles above the oceans, Sam avoids Hydra jets. While he manages to shoot one down, Sam is gunned down by the remaining jets and falls into the ocean. Back in Manhattan, the spell appears to be having no effect while Sam continues to sink into the ocean. On the Alpha Flight space station, Alpha Flight, the Guardians, and the Ultimates have evacuated with the explosives charged up to explode upon collision. Quasar awakens from her coma and helps to take down the Planetary Defense Shield. With the shield down, Captain Marvel flies to the location where the Chitauri eggs are. Back at the super-prison, Maria Hill slips by Iron Man and Hawkeye where she finds a brainwashed Blackout in his Pleasant Hill identity of Bob Hofstadder. Hill kills Blackout, freeing Manhattan from the Darkforce Dimension. After emerging from the ocean with the remaining Cube fragment in his hand, Sam meets up with the other heroes at the Triskelion which includes those who were trapped in the Darkforce dome and those trapped outside of Earth. Namor also arrives with a still-alive Winter Soldier. As the Underground plans to spring into action, they know that the battle is still in Hydra's favor with Black Panther still a captive and Hydra Supreme having most of the Cosmic Cube fragments. Back in the mysterious forest, the other Steve Rogers encounters the woman who Steve identifies as "Sharon." After the woman disappears, Steve encounters Kobik who states that they are all alone.

Issue 9
Upon seeing the other Steve Rogers, Kobik breaks down in tears over regret that her attempts to help people have ended in disaster. When Steve asks if she is lost like she is, Kobik states that they are not as they walk into the ruins of Pleasant Hill. At the Hydra Helicarrier above the White House, Hydra Supreme is approached by Baron Zemo who has Black Panther as his prisoner who is then taken away by guards, vowing revenge on Zemo. At the Washington Monument, Hydra's forces are fighting the Underground, Alpha Flight, the Avengers Unity Division, the Defenders, the Guardians of the Galaxy, Hyperion, Star Brand, Spider-Man, the U.S.Avengers, the Secret Warriors, the Ascendants, and Euroforce as Hydra's forces are backed up by the Hydra High Council and the Hydra Avengers. On the Hydra Helicarrier, Emma Frost, Beast, and Sebastian Shaw meet with Hydra Supreme where Emma declares that New Tian will not bow to Hydra. Outside, Magneto attacks the Helicarrier. While Frost, Beast, and Shaw fight the guards, Arnim Zola tells Hydra Supreme that the Cosmic Cube shards they have are enough for their weapon as they take their leave. As the X-Men join the fight against Hydra, Odinson brings down lightning to strike down the Hydra forces. This causes Taskmaster and Black Ant to defect to the other side where they free the Champions and ask to put in a good word for them. Miles Morales ends up webbing them up. Viv's presence gives Vision the willpower to break free from the virus controlling him and spread it throughout the Hydra Dreadnoughts, shutting them down. After summoning a portal that brings Jane Foster back to Earth, Doctor Strange goes to confront Chthon in order to cast him out of Scarlet Witch's body after being knocked out by Thor. Sam Wilson flies Jane away in order to retrieve Mjolnir. On the Hydra Helicarrier, Zemo goes to awaken the Army of Evil from their stasis as Winter Soldier arrives in time to free Black Panther and apprehends Zemo before he can awaken the Army. Sharon Carter pretends to be brainwashed by Doctor Faustus as she incapacitates him upon spiking his tea with a non-lethal toxin. As Black Panther sneaks up on Hydra Supreme and Zola, a variation of the Iron Man armor is equipped to Hydra Supreme in order to harness the almost complete Cosmic Cube. In the ruins of Pleasant Hill, Kobik restores the other Steve's memories, causing him to realize that he is the original Steve Rogers, reduced to a mere memory within Kobik's mind. Steve looks into a fountain and witnesses in horror what has transpired during his absence. When Steve asks Kobik to help fix what she has done, she runs away in fear as her mindscape quakes. As the remaining Hydra Helicarriers are destroyed, Black Panther runs towards the heroes to warn them as a blast knocks them to the ground, which is followed by the arrival of an armored Hydra Supreme at the steps of the Capitol Building.

Issue 10
Hydra Supreme orders the resistance to stand down as he claims that there is nothing they can do to stop him and offers them to join Hydra. Logan states that he won't get any support. As Hawkeye leads the heroes in battle, Hydra Supreme blasts them with his newly acquired god-like powers, successfully remaking the world in Hydra's image. He is then approached by Sam Wilson still holding the last Cosmic Cube fragment while Ant-Man and Winter Soldier watch. Sam gives Hydra Supreme the fragment as Rogers also asks for his shield. As Hydra Supreme absorbs the final Cube fragment into his armor, his use of the completed Cosmic Cube is cut short thanks to a plan that the Underground came up with that had Winter Soldier and Ant-Man shrinking in order to go inside the Cosmic Cube to free the original Steve Rogers. Inside Kobik's crumbling mindscape, the original Steve Rogers finds Kobik, cowering in a daycare. Steve convinces Kobik to stand up and fight back. As the sky rips open, Steve hears Bucky's voice as he grabs the Winter Soldier's manifested hands. Back in Washington DC, Hydra Supreme comes to as Kobik emerges from the portal undoing the changes that were done and bringing the original Steve Rogers with her, who materializes as Captain America. The two fight, which is witnessed worldwide. Hydra Supreme  tries to lift Mjolnir like he did during Hydra's rise to power only to fail because of Madame Hydra's enchantment failing. Cap then snatches Mjolnir, which he uses to knock Hydra Supreme out. After reuniting with his friends, Cap gives the shield back to Sam and Mjolnir back to Jane. As Kobik restores history to its natural state, she briefly sends the legacy heroes on a journey through the "Vanishing Point," where they seemingly return in mere moments. The heroes then celebrate their victory over Hydra. Several weeks later, a sense of normalcy has returned to the United States; wreckages are rebuilt, and a memorial is held for Black Widow and those who died in battle. As the Inhuman prisoners are freed from New Attlian, Brian McAllister reunites with his brother, Jason, where they find their house vandalized. The next day, he finds the townspeople repairing the damage. As Brian helps out in cleaning his house, Jason and his friend, Marcus Festerman play on the street with an action figure of the Sam Wilson version of Captain America.

Aftermath
As the United States is going through the healing process following the defeat of Hydra, a hooded figure sneaks into the high security prison known as Shadow Pillar where Hydra Supreme is the only inmate. The hooded figure arrives at Hydra Supreme's cell and is revealed to be Captain America who states that he is imprisoned there to await trial. While Hydra Supreme claims that he technically didn't commit any of the crimes he was accused of like gaining control of the country through the S.H.I.E.L.D. Act upon becoming its director, or being involved in the Planetary Defense Shield, or using the S.H.I.E.L.D. Act to previously pardon anyone involved with Hydra, Cap states that they will still find him accountable and will pay for the deaths of Black Widow, Jack Flag, and Rick Jones. At Black Widow's funeral, Hawkeye breaks down and is led away by Logan and Mockingbird. In Madripoor, Winter Soldier is watching the funeral on TV as he is currently on the trail of an infamous general, who is the target of assassination. Someone snipes the general and Winter Soldier suspects that it might be Black Widow. Back at the Shadow Pillar, Hydra Supreme states that he didn't intend for those deaths to happen as he had intended for Rick to swear loyalty to Hydra and that he would've used the Cosmic Cube to resurrect everyone he killed. In New Tian, the United States Army is patrolling the streets as the buildings are demolished. When Emma Frost is prepared to declare war with what's left of New Tian, Beast reminds her that the United States is back to full strength as he consoles her. Frost states that nobody will remember what she has done for New Tian. Back at Shadow Pillar, Hydra Supreme claims that a Hydra-ruled world is the correct course of history and that the Allied Forces used it to win World War II where Cap reminds his twisted doppelgänger that the history in question was just one of Kobik's creations. In another location, the Punisher is attempting to atone for his involvement with Hydra by killing every Hydra agent he can find. Upon destroying an abandoned warehouse where some Hydra agents were hiding, Castle is being observed by Nick Fury Jr. who speaks over the comms that the Punisher is "ready." Back at the Shadow Pillar, Cap states that those involved with Hydra will answer for their crimes and even mentions that his appearance at Shadow Pillar is because he and Hydra Supreme haven't had time to talk. Cap also comments that his Hydra counterpart left a scar on the United States. Hydra Supreme counters that many people followed him willingly. Upon leaving when he hears the approaching guards, Cap warns Hydra Supreme that he'll be ready when he returns. Upon the guards entering, Hydra Supreme is chained up as one of the guards whispers "Hail Hydra" into his ear. Steve monologues about his visit where he also comments that even though he won the battle, the war still goes on.

Issues involved

Opening salvo
 Captain America: Steve Rogers #15
 Thunderbolts Vol. 3 #12
 U.S.Avengers #5

Main plot
 Free Comic Book Day 2017 (Secret Empire)
 Secret Empire Free Previews Spotlight #1
 Secret Empire #0–10

Tie-in issues
 All-New Guardians of the Galaxy Annual #1
 Amazing Spider-Man Vol. 4 #29–31
 Avengers Vol. 7 #9-10
 Captain America #25
 Captain America: Sam Wilson #22–24
 Captain America: Steve Rogers #17–19
 Champions Vol. 2 #10-11
 Deadpool Vol. 4 #31–35
 Doctor Strange Vol. 4 #21–24
 Mighty Captain Marvel #5–8
 Not Brand Echh #14
 Occupy Avengers #8–9
 Secret Empire: Brave New World #1–5
 Secret Empire: Underground #1
 Secret Empire: United #1
 Secret Empire: Uprising #1
 Secret Warriors Vol. 2 (2017) #1–5
 U.S.Avengers #6–9
 Ultimates 2 Vol. 2 #7
 Uncanny Avengers Vol. 3 #24–25
 X-Men Blue #7–9
 X-Men Gold #7–8

Aftermath
 Secret Empire Omega #1
 Avengers Vol. 7 #11
 Champions Vol. 2 #12
 Deadpool Vol. 4 #36
 Secret Warriors Vol. 2 (2017) #6-7
 U.S.Avengers #10
 Tales of Suspense #100-104
 Uncanny Avengers Vol. 3 #26-27
 Black Bolt #8
 The Punisher Vol. 11 #218-228
 The Punisher Vol. 12 #1-16

Reception

Secret Empire #0 and #1 both received largely positive reviews. IGN rated Secret Empire #0 a score of 8.9 out of 10, calling it "great", with a verdict stating that "Secret Empire probably isn't going to be for all readers. If you haven't been won over by Captain America: Steve Rogers over the past year, Secret Empire #0 likely won't change your mind. But for those who can roll with the concept of Marvel's brightest hero becoming its greatest betrayer, this issue serves as a strong start to what promises to be a very epic and emotionally charged conflict." The review also praised the artwork on the book. James Whitbrook of io9 called it "Confusing," "gutwrenching," and "baffling," praising the dark tone of the story, saying "the sense of unease and despair that pervades Secret Empire #0 is phenomenal," and stating that "while Secret Empire'''s 0-issue nails the gut-wrenching feeling of inevitable doom, it's also perhaps tackling a little too much all at once" and noting that the series would likely be confusing for new readers.

IGN called Issue #1 "great", stating, "While the art in this issue isn't quite as consistent as it needs to be, in general Secret Empire is shaping up to be one of the rare crossover events that actually delivers on the hype. This opening chapter sets the stage well, establishing a drastically different Marvel Universe that's already feeling the influence of Hydra's reign. It offers a winning blend of character drama, superhero spectacle, and even significant humor to balance out the darker moments. If that balance can be maintained over the long haul, readers are in for a treat this summer." ComicsVerse also gave the first issue a positive review, praising Nick Spencer's writing, calling it "fearless" as well as praising Steve McNiven's artwork, saying, "the team behind this book took a huge chance and it paid off. Lovingly crafted and obviously a passion project, this issue was worth the wait." The Comics Beat stated of Issue #1, "Secret Empire delivers as Spencer and McNiven devote the time and attention to their craft to deliver on the absurd premise baked within this massive crossover."

IGN ranked Secret Empire #2 with a score of 8.3, and once again called it "great" with the verdict that "Secret Empire continues to impress in its second issue, with a story that's both epic and intimate."

IGN gave issue #3 a 7.4 score saying that "Secret Empire becomes a little too overstuffed in its third issue as more key players enter the stage".

Matthew Mueller of comicbook.com gave the fourth issue 4 out of 5 stars.

According to Comic Book Roundup, the entire crossover received an average score of 6.8 out of 10 based on 176 reviews.

Commercial performance
The series was a commercial success, with issues #0 and 1 being the third best-selling comic books of April and May, respectively."Marvel's Secret Empire tops the Sales Charts in May," IGN. Retrieved June 29, 2017

Controversy
One of the cover variants by Dan Mora featuring Magneto and Captain America as a Hydra agent were met with controversy by fans. The backlash was because Magneto, a Jewish Holocaust survivor with a hatred for Nazis, was in a lineup of villain covers featuring Hydra members, despite being a neutral party in the main storyline.

 Collected editions 

In other media
Season 4 of Agents of S.H.I.E.L.D. aired concurrently with the early issues of Secret Empire and featured the "Agents of Hydra" story arc that shared many similarities with it. Both depict an American society being successfully taken over by Hydra after a heroic character was made to believe his allegiance was to Hydra his whole life due to a reality-altering device (although, in the Agents of S.H.I.E.L.D. case, it was a virtual reality). Both storylines also feature lines that could be interpreted as references to then-current American politics as well as exploration of the lives of everyday citizens under the fascist regime. Although Agents of S.H.I.E.L.D. focused on a different cast of characters, the similarities between two storylines were noted by several reviewers. Additionally, Secret Empire #1 made reference to the Malick Corporation which is named after Powers Boothe's character Gideon Malick from Agents of S.H.I.E.L.D. who had previously appeared in The Avengers.Avengers Endgame contained a reference to the "Hail Hydra" reveal that leads up to the series in Captain America: Steve Rogers'' #1, by having Steve Rogers convince past versions of Jasper Sitwell and Brock Rumlow that he is of Hydra so that they will hand him the sceptre containing the Mind Stone.

References

External links
 Secret Empire at Marvel Wiki

Captain America storylines
Comics about neo-Nazism